Planica 1974 was a Smuški poleti Ski Flying Week competition, held from 15–17 March 1974 in Planica, Yugoslavia. With total 115,000 people in three days.

Schedule

Competition
On 14 March 1974 hill test and practice was on schedule. Vojko Blaznik was honoured to be first to test the hill this year, landing at 91 metres. Jiří Raška set the distance of the day at 146 metres.

On 15 March 1974 only official training was on schedule at first in front of 20,000 people, but teams and chiefs of competition decided in the last moment, that this will actually be a first day of competition. Best jump of two rounds to count into official results. Day started very promising with tied world record at 169 metres (554 ft), set by Walter Steiner in trial round. In invalid first round where gate was two times lowered, Walter Steiner crashed at 177 metres (581 ft) world record distance.

On 16 March 1974 second day of competition was on schedule in front of 40,000 people. Finnish Esko Rautionaho set the longest jump of the day at 161 meters. Competitors jumped in reversed order from first day competition on Friday with a few exceptions as Norwegians missed the first day of competition and didn't perform: Loštrek (Bib1), D. Pudgar (2), Fossum (6), Sætre (16) and Halvorsen (26). First round was canceled and restarted after first 9 jumpers from a gate lower. As Steiner was last on the start of restarted first round, as only one he jumped even from a gate lower than others and round was valid.

On 17 March 1974 third day of competition was on schedule in front of 55,000 people. First round was canceled and restarted from a lower gate only after 6 jumpers. Whole 1st round was performed from the same gate for all, in the 2nd round Walter Steiner jumped from a gate lower than others and in the 3rd round he jumped even two gates lower than everyone else and still won the competition overshadow other competititors with the longest jump of the day at 166 metres.

Competition: Day 1
9:40 AM — 15 March 1974 — 1 best of 2 rounds — first round canceled and restarted — chronological order

Competition: Day 2
9:30 AM — 16 March 1974 — 1 best of 2 rounds — chronological order incomplete

Competition: Day 3
9:30 AM — 17 March 1974 — 1 best of 3 rounds — chronological order incomplete

 Not recognized. Crash at WR! Didn't count into final results! Counted into final result! World record! Crash, touch!

Official results
Three rounds counted into official results — one best round from each three days.

Ski flying world records

 Not recognized! Crash at world record distance.

References

1974 in Yugoslav sport
1974 in ski jumping
1974 in Slovenia
Ski jumping competitions in Yugoslavia
International sports competitions hosted by Yugoslavia
Ski jumping competitions in Slovenia
International sports competitions hosted by Slovenia
March 1974 sports events in Europe